In Russian Orthodox tradition, Holy Wisdom (Russian:   "Holy Sophia, Divine Wisdom") is a conventional topos of iconography, attested since at least the late 14th century.

The "Novgorod type" is named for the icon of Holy Wisdom in Saint Sophia Cathedral in Novgorod (16th century), but represented by the older icon in the Cathedral of the Annunciation, Moscow, dated to the early 15th century.
Also known as "fire-winged" (огнекрылой), this type shows Holy Wisdom as a fiery angel with wings, seated on a throne and flanked
by the Theotokos and by Saint Cosmas of Maiuma.

A related but highly divergent type is known as "Wisdom hath builded her Home".
The name is a quotation of Proverbs 9:1 and references the incarnation of Christ the Logos, identified with Holy Wisdom, the "house" being the Theotokos.
The earliest icon known under this title is a late-14th-century fresco in the Church of the Assumption in Volotovo Field, Veliky Novgorod, but its most notable representation is the mid-16th-century icon from the Cathedral of Athanasius and Cyril of the  Alexandrian Kirillov Monastery near Novgorod.
The composition of these icons develops during the 17th and 18th century in a reflection of the developing views in Russian mysticism, culminating in the "Sophiology" dispute in the early 20th century. The main point of contention is the question whether "Wisdom", i.e. Christ, or the "House", i.e. the Theotokos, should take center stage. 
In the original conception of this type, the Volotovo Field icon and derived examples of the 16th century, "Wisdom" is depicted as in the Novgorod type, as a fiery winged angel sitting on a throne, while the Theotokos with Child is shown separately. By the 18th century, there are two competing variants, one centered on crucified Christ  and the other the Theotokos.

See also

Russian icons
Sophiology
Georges Florovsky

References

 Hunt, Priscilla, "The Novgorod Sophia Icon and 'The Problem of Old Russian Culture' Between Orthodoxy and Sophiology", Symposion: A Journal of Russian Thought, vol. 4–5, (2000), 1–41.
Lifshits, L., «София Премудрость Божия» в русской иконе, Наше Наследие 65 (2003).
Lukashov, A. M., «София Премудрость Божия» in: София Премудрость Божия: выставка русской иконописи XIII-XIX веков из собраний музеев России (2000), 152.
Lukashov, A. M., «Премудрость созда себе дом» in: София Премудрость Божия: выставка русской иконописи XIII-XIX веков из собраний музеев России (2000), 198–200.
Арсений (Иващенко) (ed.),  Philotheus I of Constantinople, Three Sermons to Bishop Ignatius explaining the verse of Proverbs: "Wisdom has built a house for herself." [Три речи к епископу Игнатию с объяснением изречения Притчи «Премудрость созда себе дом»] Greek text and Russian translation. Novgorod, 1898.
Игнатий, архиеп.  "On the icon of St. Sophia in Novgorod's St. Sophia Cathedral" [Об иконе Св. Софии в новгородском Софийском соборе], Imperial Archaeological Society 11, St. Petersburg (1857), 244–269.
Filimonov G.D., "Essays on Russian Christian iconography: Sophia the Wisdom of God" [Очерки русской христианской иконографии: София Премудрость Божия],  Bulletin of the Society for Old Russian Art (1876), 1–20.
Afanasev, A., София Премудрость Божия в христианской иконографии, ЖМП 8 (1982), 75.
Kvlividze, N. V., Икона Софии Премудрости Божией и особенности новгородской литургической традиции в конце XV века, in: Сакральная топография средневекового города: Известия института христианской культуры средневековья vol. 1 (1998), p. 98.

External links
icons.pstgu.ru

Russian icons
Icons